The Elks Bowl was a postseason college football bowl game played after the 1953 and 1954 regular seasons. There was also an earlier playing of the game, at the junior varsity level, in 1952. Each game was held at a different venue in North Carolina. The bowl's name came from the Benevolent and Protective Order of Elks, a fraternal order, with proceeds from the game going to their charitable works. Like some other postseason match-ups of the era, such as the Grape Bowl, Glass Bowl, and Optimist Bowl, results are listed in NCAA records, but the games were not considered NCAA-sanctioned bowls.

Game results

 The 1952 game was played between junior varsity teams.

Notes
 Morris Harvey halfback Jimmy Carr was selected as most valuable player of the January 1954 game.
 For the December 1954 game, Wofford had been invited to face Appalachian State, but were unable to accept due to other commitments; Newberry was then invited and accepted.

See also
 List of college bowl games

References

Defunct college football bowls